The 1999 Japanese Grand Prix (formally the XXV Fuji Television Japanese Grand Prix) was a Formula One motor race held on 31 October 1999 at the Suzuka International Racing Course in Suzuka, Japan. It was the sixteenth and final round of the 1999 Formula One season. The 53-lap race was won by McLaren driver Mika Häkkinen after starting from second position. Michael Schumacher finished second in a Ferrari with teammate Eddie Irvine finishing third. Häkkinen's victory confirmed him as 1999 Drivers' Champion. Ferrari were also confirmed as Constructors' Champions.

This was the last Formula One race  for Stewart Grand Prix, Toranosuke Takagi, Alessandro Zanardi and for the 1996 World Champion, Damon Hill.

Report

Championship permutations
Going into this race, Ferrari's Eddie Irvine led the Drivers' Championship by four points from Häkkinen, 70 to 66. Häkkinen therefore needed to win the race, or to finish second with Irvine no higher than fifth, or to finish third with Irvine finishing outside the top six.

Victory for Häkkinen would give him the Championship regardless of where Irvine finished: even if Irvine finished second, both drivers would have 76 points but Häkkinen would have five wins to Irvine's four. Similarly, the Finn would be Champion if he finished second with Irvine fifth (as he would have three second places to Irvine's two), or if he finished third without Irvine scoring (as he would have four third places to Irvine's two).

Qualifying
Qualifying saw Irvine's Ferrari teammate, Michael Schumacher, take pole position with Häkkinen alongside on the front row. David Coulthard was third in the second McLaren, with Heinz-Harald Frentzen fourth in the Jordan. Irvine struggled throughout, also suffering a heavy crash at the Hairpin, and could only manage fifth, over 1.5 seconds slower than Schumacher and over 1.1 slower than Häkkinen. The top ten was completed by the Prosts of Olivier Panis and Jarno Trulli, Johnny Herbert in the Stewart, Ralf Schumacher in the Williams and Jean Alesi in the Sauber.

Race
Häkkinen beat Schumacher off the line, with Panis charging into third ahead of Irvine, Coulthard and Frentzen. Zanardi pulled off the track into the pits in the second Williams with electrical problems on lap 1. The Finn quickly built a comfortable lead, and it became clear that the Ferraris could not match him. As Trulli in the second Prost retired when his engine failed on lap 4.

Panis retired when his alternator broke on lap 20, meanwhile Hill retired after spinning off the track but managed to come back to the pits to retire with mental driver fatigue on lap 21 in his final grand prix, Coulthard passed Irvine for third during the first round of pit stops. However, on lap 34, he made a mistake and spun into a wall, losing his nose. He pitted and rejoined a lap down, just in front of Schumacher. It was alleged that the Scot deliberately held up the German driver, before retiring several laps later with a hydraulic failure. Schumacher later criticized Coulthard's behaviour.

Häkkinen eventually took the chequered flag five seconds ahead of Schumacher and, with it, his second Drivers' Championship. Irvine finished a minute and a half behind Schumacher in third, nonetheless helping Ferrari secure their first Constructors' Championship since . The minor points went to Frentzen, Ralf Schumacher and Alesi.

Classification

Qualifying

Race

Championship standings after the race

Drivers'  Championship standings

Constructors Championship standings

 Note: Only the top five positions are included for both sets of standings.

References

Japanese Grand Prix
Japanese Grand Prix
Grand Prix
Japanese Grand Prix